Lee Mitchell (born ) is an English rugby league footballer who plays as a  forward for the Rochdale Hornets in the Betfred Championship.

Background
Mitchell was born in Billinge, Merseyside.

Playing career
Lee Mitchell made his début for Warrington Wolves on Sunday 19 August 2007.

References

External links

Profile at hornetsrugbyleague.co.uk
Profile at warringtonwolves.com

1988 births
Living people
Batley Bulldogs players
Castleford Tigers players
English rugby league players
Leigh Leopards players
London Broncos players
Rochdale Hornets players
Rugby league locks
Rugby league players from Billinge, Merseyside
Rugby league props
Rugby league second-rows
Warrington Wolves players
Whitehaven R.L.F.C. players